Rise Up may refer to:

Film and television
Rise Up (film), Documentary Film (2007)
"Rise Up" (Grey's Anatomy) Season 12, Episode 22 - Mama Tried (2016)

Music

Albums 
 Rise Up! (Bobby Conn album), 1998
 Rise Up (Cypress Hill album), 2010
 Rise Up (Peter Frampton album), 1980
 Rise Up (Saliva album), 2014
 Rise Up (Yves Larock album), 2008
 Rise Up (Art of Dying album), 2015
 Rise Up (Cliff Richard album), 2018
 Rise Up! Shteyt Oyf!, a 2002 album by The Klezmatics 
 Rise Up, a 1990 album by Bobby Kimball
 Rise Up, a 1976 album by Commodores
 Rise Up!, a 2008 album by Lonnie Smith
 Rise Up, a 2018 reggae album by Alan Steward
 Rise Up (Colors of Peace), a 2013 compilation album of songs written by Fethullah Gülen

Songs 
 "Rise Up" (Parachute Club song), 1983
 "Rise Up" (Yves Larock song), 2007
 "Rise Up" (Cypress Hill song), 2010
 "Rise Up" (Freaky Fortune song), 2014
 "Rise Up", a 1995 song by Skunk Anansie from Paranoid & Sunburnt
 "Rise Up", a 1997 song by Die Krupps from Paradise Now
 "Rise Up", a song by Vanessa Amorosi from her 2001 album Turn to Me
 "Rise Up", a 2003 song by Pennywise from From the Ashes
 "Rise Up," a 2004 song by Drowning Pool
 "Rise Up", a 2007 song by R. Kelly from Double Up
 "Rise Up", a 2011 single by Kenny Chesney
 "Rise Up", a 2013 song by Dreadzone from the album Escapades
 "Rise Up", a song by Beyoncé from the 2013 soundtrack Epic
 "Rise Up", a song by Andra Day from her 2015 album Cheers to the Fall

Other uses
 Rise Up (conference), an annual conference hosted by Catholic Christian Outreach

See also
 "Rise Up! Rise Up!", a 2006 song by Cursive from Happy Hollow
 Rise up, Ukraine!, a series of political protests in 2013
 "Rise Up 2.0", a single by New Zealand rock band Six60
 Rise Up Australia Party, a far right political party formed in 2011
 Rise Up Philippines or Bangon Pilipinas, a political party formed in 2004
 Riseup, a volunteer-run collective providing secure online services